Windsor Park is a residential neighbourhood in the southwest quadrant of Calgary, Alberta.  It is bounded by 50 Avenue S to the north, Macleod Trail to the east, 58 Avenue S to the south and the Calgary Golf & Country Club and Elbow River to the west.  Chinook Centre is located southeast of the neighbourhood.

Development started in 1940, and the area was annexed to the City of Calgary in 1951.  It is represented in the Calgary City Council by the Ward 11 councillors.

Demographics 

Residents in this community had a median household income of $39,425 in 2000, and there were 22.6% low income residents living in the neighbourhood. As of 2000, 22.2% of the residents were immigrants. A proportion of 66.4% of the buildings were condominiums or apartments, and 60.8% of the housing was used for renting.

See also 
 List of neighbourhoods in Calgary

References

External links 
 Windsor Park Community Association

Neighbourhoods in Calgary